Mayisyan, is a village in the Armavir Province of Armenia. It was founded as a collective farm (sovkhoz) and named Sovkhoz No.2. Later it became known as Imeni Beriya, named after Lavrentiy Beria. In 1953, it was renamed Imeni Zhdanovaor Zhdanov after Andrei Zhdanov. In 2006, the village was renamed Mayisyan, in memory of the Armenian victory over the Turks during the battles of Abaran and Sardarabad in May 1918.

See also 
Armavir Province

References

World Gazeteer: Armenia – World-Gazetteer.com

Populated places in Armavir Province